The Women's Royal Army Corps (WRAC; sometimes pronounced acronymically as , a term unpopular with its members) was the corps to which all women in the British Army belonged from 1949 to 1992, except medical, dental and veterinary officers and chaplains (who belonged to the same corps as the men), the Ulster Defence Regiment which recruited women from 1973, and nurses (who belonged to Queen Alexandra's Royal Army Nursing Corps).

History
The WRAC was formed on 1 February 1949, by Army Order 6, as the successor to the Auxiliary Territorial Service (ATS) that had been founded in 1938. For much of its existence, its members performed administrative and other support tasks. In March 1952 the ranks of the WRAC, which had previously been Subaltern, Junior Commander, Senior Commander and Controller were harmonised with the rest of the British Army.

In 1974, two soldiers of the corps were killed by the Provisional IRA in the Guildford pub bombings.

In October 1990 WRAC officers employed with other corps were transferred to those corps and in April 1992 the WRAC was disbanded and its remaining members transferred to the Corps they served with. Those who served with the Royal Army Pay Corps, the Corps of Royal Military Police, the Military Provost Staff Corps, the Royal Army Educational Corps, the Army Legal Corps and the Staff Clerks from the Royal Army Ordnance Corps were transferred to the newly formed Adjutant General's Corps.  The post of Director WRAC, which carried the rank of Brigadier, was also abolished and it was seven years before a woman, Brigadier Patricia Purves, again reached that rank.

Senior posts
The highest rank available to a serving officer was Brigadier, held by the Director WRAC, although the Controller-Commandant, a member of the Royal Family, held a higher honorary rank. Princess Mary held the post from 1949 to her death in 1965 (beginning as a Major-General and being promoted General on 23 November 1956) and the Duchess of Kent held it from 1967 to 1992 (with the rank of Major-General).

List of directors WRAC
Directors of the WRAC were:
Brigadier Dame Mary Tyrwhitt, 1949–1950
Brigadier Dame Mary Coulshed, 1950–1954
Brigadier Dame Mary Railton, 1954–1957
Brigadier Dame Mary Colvin, 1957–1961
Brigadier Dame Jean Rivett-Drake, 1961–1964
Brigadier Dame Joan Henderson, 1964– 25 August 1967
Brigadier Dame Mary Anderson, 1967–1970
Brigadier Sheila Heaney, 1970–1973
Brigadier Eileen Nolan, 1973–1977
Brigadier Anne Field, 1977–1982
Brigadier Helen Meechie, 1982–1986
Brigadier Shirley Nield, 1986–1989
Brigadier Gael Ramsey, 1989–1992
Brigadier Joan Roulstone, 1992–1994 (as Director Women (Army) during transitional period)

Band of the WRAC
The Staff Band of the Women's Royal Army Corps was an all female military band. It was formed in 1949, and was the only all-female band in the British Armed Forces by the time it was disestablished. The Central Band of the Women's Royal Air Force, which was one of only two all-female bands to exist, transferred some of its musicians to the Band of the WRAC after it was disbanded in 1972. Since the mid-1990s, women have served in all British Army bands. The instruments, assets and personnel of the former WRAC Band became the new Band of the Adjutant General's Corps.

Reunion meetings
The WRAC organizes Reunion Meetings to promote solidarity among its former members.

See also
Women's Royal Air Force
Women's Royal Naval Service

References

Further reading
 Bidwell Shelford. Women's Royal Army Corps (1997) 141pp
 Noakes, Lucy. Women in the British Army: War and the Gentle Sex, 1907–48 (2006), the standard scholarly history; focus on ATS
 WRAC archive of regiments.org

Military units and formations established in 1949
British administrative corps
All-female military units and formations
Women's organisations based in the United Kingdom
Military units and formations disestablished in 1992
1949 establishments in the United Kingdom
1992 disestablishments in the United Kingdom